Vladislav Yakovlev may refer to:
 Vladislav Yakovlev (rower)
 Vladislav Yakovlev (footballer)